Virendra Singh is a member of the Bharatiya Janata Party and has won the 2019 Indian general elections from the Ballia (Lok Sabha constituency). He is national president of BJP kisan Morcha.

As state president of BJP Kisan Morcha, he started "Gaon Chalo Abhiyaan" to promote awareness among farmers and villagers especially in the field of agriculture.

Early life and education

Virendra Singh was born on 21 October 1956 to Shri Ramnath Singh and Smt. Draupadi Singh. He was born in a village named Dokati, which is located in Ballia district in Uttar Pradesh. Virendra Singh completed his Bachelor of Arts (B.A.) from Banaras Hindu University (B.H.U.). He married Renu Singh on 19 June 1981.

Political career

1988-1989: District President, Bharatiya Janata Yuva Morcha
1989-1992: District President, Bharatiya Janata Party (B.J.P.)
1991: Elected to 10th Lok Sabha
1996-98: State President, Kisan Morcha (BJP)
1998: Re-elected to 12th Lok Sabha (2nd term)
2000-2004: State Coordinator, Swadeshi Jagran Manch
May, 2014: Re-elected to 16th Lok Sabha (3rd term)
May, 2019: Re-elected to 17th Lok Sabha (4th term)
1 Sep. 2014 onwards: Member, Committee on Papers Laid on the Table; Member, Standing Committee on Agriculture; Member, Consultative Committee, Ministry of Chemicals and Fertilizers

References

Living people
India MPs 2014–2019
People from Bhadohi district
Lok Sabha members from Uttar Pradesh
Bharatiya Janata Party politicians from Uttar Pradesh
1956 births
India MPs 1991–1996
India MPs 1998–1999
People from Ballia
India MPs 2019–present